Omega−3 fatty acids, also called Omega-3 oils, ω−3 fatty acids or n−3 fatty acids, are polyunsaturated fatty acids (PUFAs) characterized by the presence of a double bond, three atoms away from the terminal methyl group in their chemical structure.  They are widely distributed in nature, being important constituents of animal lipid metabolism, and they play an important role in the human diet and in human physiology. The three types of omega−3 fatty acids involved in human physiology are α-linolenic acid (ALA), eicosapentaenoic acid (EPA) and docosahexaenoic acid (DHA). ALA can be found in plants, while DHA and EPA are found in algae and fish. Marine algae and phytoplankton are primary sources of omega−3 fatty acids. DHA and EPA accumulate in fish that eat these algae. Common sources of plant oils containing ALA include walnuts, edible seeds, and flaxseeds as well as hempseed oil, while sources of EPA and DHA include fish and fish oils, and algae oil.

Mammals are unable to synthesize the essential omega−3 fatty acid ALA and can only obtain it through diet. However, they can use ALA, when available, to form EPA and DHA, by creating additional double bonds along its carbon chain (desaturation) and extending it (elongation). Namely, ALA (18 carbons and 3 double bonds) is used to make EPA (20 carbons and 5 double bonds), which is then used to make DHA (22 carbons and 6 double bonds). The ability to make the longer-chain omega−3 fatty acids from ALA may be impaired in aging. In foods exposed to air, unsaturated fatty acids are vulnerable to oxidation and rancidity.

There is no high-quality evidence that dietary supplementation with omega−3 fatty acids reduces the risk of cancer or cardiovascular disease. Furthermore, fish oil supplement studies have failed to support claims of preventing heart attacks or strokes or any vascular disease outcomes.

History
In 1929, George and Mildred Burr discovered that fatty acids were critical to health. If fatty acids were absent from the diet, a life-threatening deficiency syndrome ensued. The Burrs coined the phrase "essential fatty acids". Since then, researchers have shown a growing interest in unsaturated essential fatty acids as they form the framework for the organism’s cell membranes. Subsequently, awareness of the health benefits of essential fatty acids has dramatically increased since the 1980s.

On September 8, 2004, the U.S. Food and Drug Administration gave "qualified health claim" status to EPA and DHA omega−3 fatty acids, stating, "supportive but not conclusive research shows that consumption of EPA and DHA [omega−3] fatty acids may reduce the risk of coronary heart disease". This updated and modified their health risk advice letter of 2001 (see below).

The Canadian Food Inspection Agency has recognized the importance of DHA omega−3 and permits the following claim for DHA: "DHA, an omega−3 fatty acid, supports the normal physical development of the brain, eyes, and nerves primarily in children under two years of age."

Historically, whole food diets contained sufficient amounts of omega−3, but because omega−3 is readily oxidized, the trend to shelf-stable, processed foods has led to a deficiency in omega−3 in manufactured foods.

Nomenclature

The terms ω−3 ("omega−3") fatty acid and n−3 fatty acid are derived from the nomenclature of organic chemistry.  One way in which an unsaturated fatty acid is named is determined by the location, in its carbon chain, of the double bond which is closest to the methyl end of the molecule. In general terminology, n (or ω) represents the locant of the methyl end of the molecule, while the number n−x (or ω−x) refers to the locant of its nearest double bond. Thus, in omega−3 fatty acids in particular, there is a double bond located at the carbon numbered 3, starting from the methyl end of the fatty acid chain. This classification scheme is useful since most chemical changes occur at the carboxyl end of the molecule, while the methyl group and its nearest double bond are unchanged in most chemical or enzymatic reactions.

In the expressions n−x or ω−x, the symbol is a minus sign rather than a hyphen (or dash), although it is never read as such. Also, the symbol n (or ω) represents the locant of the methyl end, counted from the carboxyl end of the fatty acid carbon chain. For instance, in an omega−3 fatty acid with 18 carbon atoms (see illustration), where the methyl end is at location 18 from the carboxyl end, n (or ω) represents the number 18, and the notation n−3 (or ω−3) represents the subtraction 18−3 = 15, where 15 is the locant of the double bond which is closest to the methyl end, counted from the carboxyl end of the chain.

Although n and ω (omega) are synonymous, the IUPAC recommends that n be used to identify the highest carbon number of a fatty acid. Nevertheless, the more common name – omega−3 fatty acid – is used in both the lay media and scientific literature.

Example
For example, α-linolenic acid (ALA; illustration) is an 18-carbon chain having three double bonds, the first being located at the third carbon from the methyl end of the fatty acid chain. Hence, it is an omega−3 fatty acid. Counting from the other end of the chain, that is the carboxyl end, the three double bonds are located at carbons 9, 12, and 15. These three locants are typically indicated as Δ9c, Δ12c, Δ15c, or cisΔ9, cisΔ12, cisΔ15, or cis-cis-cis-Δ9,12,15, where c or cis means that the double bonds have a cis configuration.

α-Linolenic acid is polyunsaturated (containing more than one double bond) and is also described by a lipid number, 18:3, meaning that there are 18 carbon atoms and 3 double bonds.

Chemistry

An omega−3 fatty acid is a fatty acid with multiple double bonds, where the first double bond is between the third and fourth carbon atoms from the end of the carbon atom chain. "Short-chain" omega−3 fatty acids have a chain of 18 carbon atoms or less, while "long-chain" omega−3 fatty acids have a chain of 20 or more.

Three omega−3 fatty acids are important in human physiology, α-linolenic acid (18:3, n-3; ALA), eicosapentaenoic acid (20:5, n-3; EPA), and docosahexaenoic acid (22:6, n-3; DHA). These three polyunsaturates have either 3, 5, or 6 double bonds in a carbon chain of 18, 20, or 22 carbon atoms, respectively. As with most naturally-produced fatty acids, all double bonds are in the cis-configuration, in other words, the two hydrogen atoms are on the same side of the double bond; and the double bonds are interrupted by methylene bridges (--), so that there are two single bonds between each pair of adjacent double bonds.

List of omega−3 fatty acids
This table lists several different names for the most common omega−3 fatty acids found in nature.

Forms
Omega−3 fatty acids occur naturally in two forms, triglycerides and phospholipids. In the triglycerides, they, together with other fatty acids, are bonded to glycerol; three fatty acids are attached to glycerol. Phospholipid omega−3 is composed of two fatty acids attached to a phosphate group via glycerol.

The triglycerides can be converted to the free fatty acid or to methyl or ethyl esters, and the individual esters of omega−3 fatty acids are available.

Biochemistry

Transporters
DHA in the form of lysophosphatidylcholine is transported into the brain by a membrane transport protein, MFSD2A, which is exclusively expressed in the endothelium of the blood–brain barrier.

Mechanism of action
The 'essential' fatty acids were given their name when researchers found that they are essential to normal growth in young children and animals. The omega−3 fatty acid DHA, also known as docosahexaenoic acid, is found in high abundance in the human brain. It is produced by a desaturation process, but humans lack the desaturase enzyme, which acts to insert double bonds at the ω6 and ω3 position. Therefore, the ω6 and ω3 polyunsaturated fatty acids cannot be synthesized, are appropriately called essential fatty acids, and must be obtained from the diet.

In 1964, it was discovered that enzymes found in sheep tissues convert omega−6 arachidonic acid into the inflammatory agent, prostaglandin E2, which is involved in the immune response of traumatized and infected tissues. By 1979, eicosanoids were further identified, including thromboxanes, prostacyclins, and leukotrienes. The eicosanoids typically have a short period of activity in the body, starting with synthesis from fatty acids and ending with metabolism by enzymes. If the rate of synthesis exceeds the rate of metabolism, the excess eicosanoids may have deleterious effects. Researchers found that certain omega−3 fatty acids are also converted into eicosanoids and docosanoids, but at a slower rate. If both omega−3 and omega−6 fatty acids are present, they will "compete" to be transformed, so the ratio of long-chain omega−3:omega−6 fatty acids directly affects the type of eicosanoids that are produced.

Interconversion

Conversion efficiency of ALA to EPA and DHA
Humans can convert short-chain omega−3 fatty acids to long-chain forms (EPA, DHA) with an efficiency below 5%. The omega−3 conversion efficiency is greater in women than in men, but less studied. Higher ALA and DHA values found in plasma phospholipids of women may be due to the higher activity of desaturases, especially that of delta-6-desaturase.

These conversions occur competitively with omega−6 fatty acids, which are essential closely related chemical analogues that are derived from linoleic acid. They both utilize the same desaturase and elongase proteins in order to synthesize inflammatory regulatory proteins. The products of both pathways are vital for growth making a balanced diet of omega−3 and omega−6 important to an individual's health. A balanced intake ratio of 1:1 was believed to be ideal in order for proteins to be able to synthesize both pathways sufficiently, but this has been controversial as of recent research.

The conversion of ALA to EPA and further to DHA in humans has been reported to be limited, but varies with individuals. Women have higher ALA-to-DHA conversion efficiency than men, which is presumed to be due to the lower rate of use of dietary ALA for beta-oxidation. One preliminary study showed that EPA can be increased by lowering the amount of dietary linoleic acid, and DHA can be increased by elevating intake of dietary ALA.

Omega−6 to omega−3 ratio

Human diet has changed rapidly in recent centuries resulting in a reported increased diet of omega−6 in comparison to omega−3. The rapid evolution of human diet away from a 1:1 omega−3 and omega−6 ratio, such as during the Neolithic Agricultural Revolution, has presumably been too fast for humans to have adapted to biological profiles adept at balancing omega−3 and omega−6 ratios of 1:1. This is commonly believed to be the reason why modern diets are correlated with many inflammatory disorders. While omega−3 polyunsaturated fatty acids may be beneficial in preventing heart disease in humans, the level of omega−6 polyunsaturated fatty acids (and, therefore, the ratio) does not matter.

Both omega−6 and omega−3 fatty acids are essential: humans must consume them in their diet. Omega−6 and omega−3 eighteen-carbon polyunsaturated fatty acids compete for the same metabolic enzymes, thus the omega−6:omega−3 ratio of ingested fatty acids has significant influence on the ratio and rate of production of eicosanoids, a group of hormones intimately involved in the body's inflammatory and homeostatic processes, which include the prostaglandins, leukotrienes, and thromboxanes, among others. Altering this ratio can change the body's metabolic and inflammatory state. 

Metabolites of omega−6 are more inflammatory (esp. arachidonic acid) than those of omega−3. However in terms of heart health omega-6 fatty acids are less harmful than they are presumed to be. A meta-analysis of six randomized trials found that replacing saturated fat with omega-6 fats reduced the risk of coronary events by 24%. 

A healthy ratio of omega-6 to omega-3 is needed; healthy ratios, according to some authors, range from 1:1 to 1:4. Other authors believe that a ratio of 4:1 (4 times as much omega−6 as omega−3) is already healthy.

Typical Western diets provide ratios of between 10:1 and 30:1 (i.e., dramatically higher levels of omega−6 than omega−3). The ratios of omega−6 to omega−3 fatty acids in some common vegetable oils are: canola 2:1, hemp 2–3:1, soybean 7:1, olive 3–13:1, sunflower (no omega−3), flax 1:3, cottonseed (almost no omega−3), peanut (no omega−3), grapeseed oil (almost no omega−3) and corn oil 46:1.

Dietary sources

Dietary recommendations
In the United States, the Institute of Medicine publishes a system of Dietary Reference Intakes, which includes Recommended Dietary Allowances (RDAs) for individual nutrients, and Acceptable Macronutrient Distribution Ranges (AMDRs) for certain groups of nutrients, such as fats. When there is insufficient evidence to determine an RDA, the institute may publish an Adequate Intake (AI) instead, which has a similar meaning but is less certain. The AI for α-linolenic acid is 1.6 grams/day for men and 1.1 grams/day for women, while the AMDR is 0.6% to 1.2% of total energy. Because the physiological potency of EPA and DHA is much greater than that of ALA, it is not possible to estimate one AMDR for all omega−3 fatty acids. Approximately 10 percent of the AMDR can be consumed as EPA and/or DHA. The Institute of Medicine has not established a RDA or AI for EPA, DHA or the combination, so there is no Daily Value (DVs are derived from RDAs), no labeling of foods or supplements as providing a DV percentage of these fatty acids per serving, and no labeling a food or supplement as an excellent source, or "High in..." As for safety, there was insufficient evidence as of 2005 to set an upper tolerable limit for omega−3 fatty acids, although the FDA has advised that adults can safely consume up to a total of 3 grams per day of combined DHA and EPA, with no more than 2 g from dietary supplements.

The American Heart Association (AHA) has made recommendations for EPA and DHA due to their cardiovascular benefits: individuals with no history of coronary heart disease or myocardial infarction should consume oily fish two times per week; and "Treatment is reasonable" for those having been diagnosed with coronary heart disease. For the latter the AHA does not recommend a specific amount of EPA + DHA, although it notes that most trials were at or close to 1000 mg/day. The benefit appears to be on the order of a 9% decrease in relative risk. The European Food Safety Authority (EFSA) approved a claim "EPA and DHA contributes to the normal function of the heart" for products that contain at least 250 mg EPA + DHA. The report did not address the issue of people with pre-existing heart disease. The World Health Organization recommends regular fish consumption (1-2 servings per week, equivalent to 200 to 500 mg/day EPA + DHA) as protective against coronary heart disease and ischaemic stroke.

Contamination
Heavy metal poisoning from consuming fish oil supplements is highly unlikely, because heavy metals (mercury, lead, nickel, arsenic, and cadmium) selectively bind with protein in the fish flesh rather than accumulate in the oil.

However, other contaminants (PCBs, furans, dioxins, and PBDEs) might be found, especially in less-refined fish oil supplements.

Throughout their history, the Council for Responsible Nutrition and the World Health Organization have published acceptability standards regarding contaminants in fish oil. The most stringent current standard is the International Fish Oils Standard. Fish oils that are molecularly distilled under vacuum typically make this highest-grade; levels of contaminants are stated in parts per billion per trillion.

Rancidity 
A 2022 study found that a number of products on the market used oxidised oils, with the rancidity often masked by flavourings. Another study found that 2015 an average of 20% of products had excess oxidation. Whether rancid fish oil is harmful remains unclear. Some studies show that highly oxidised fish oil can have negative impact on cholesterol levels. Animal testing showed that high doses have toxic effects. Furthermore, rancid oil is likely to be less effective than fresh fish oil.

Fish
The most widely available dietary source of EPA and DHA is oily fish, such as salmon, herring, mackerel, anchovies, and sardines. Oils from these fishes have around seven times as much omega−3 as omega−6. Other oily fish, such as tuna, also contain n-3 in somewhat lesser amounts. Although fish are a dietary source of omega−3 fatty acids, fish do not synthesize omega−3 fatty acids, but rather obtain them via their food supply, including algae or plankton. In order for farmed marine fish to have amounts of EPA and DHA comparable to those of wild-caught fish, their feed must be supplemented with EPA and DHA, most commonly in the form of fish oil. For this reason, 81% of the global fish oil supply in 2009 was consumed by aquaculture.

Fish oil

Marine and freshwater fish oil vary in content of arachidonic acid, EPA and DHA. They also differ in their effects on organ lipids.

Not all forms of fish oil may be equally digestible. Of four studies that compare bioavailability of the glyceryl ester form of fish oil vs. the ethyl ester form, two have concluded the natural glyceryl ester form is better, and the other two studies did not find a significant difference. No studies have shown the ethyl ester form to be superior, although it is cheaper to manufacture.

Krill
Krill oil is a source of omega−3 fatty acids. The effect of krill oil, at a lower dose of EPA + DHA (62.8%), was demonstrated to be similar to that of fish oil on blood lipid levels and markers of inflammation in healthy humans. While not an endangered species, krill are a mainstay of the diets of many ocean-based species including whales, causing environmental and scientific concerns about their sustainability.
Preliminary studies appear to indicate that the DHA and EPA omega−3 fatty acids found in krill oil may be more bio-available than in fish oil. Additionally, krill oil contains astaxanthin, a marine-source keto-carotenoid antioxidant that may act synergistically with EPA and DHA.

Plant sources

Table 1. ALA content as the percentage of the seed oil.

Table 2. ALA content as the percentage of the whole food.

Linseed (or flaxseed) (Linum usitatissimum) and its oil are perhaps the most widely available botanical source of the omega−3 fatty acid ALA. Flaxseed oil consists of approximately 55% ALA, which makes it six times richer than most fish oils in omega−3 fatty acids. A portion of this is converted by the body to EPA and DHA, though the actual converted percentage may differ between men and women.

In 2013 Rothamsted Research in the UK reported they had developed a genetically modified form of the plant Camelina that produced EPA and DHA. Oil from the seeds of this plant contained on average 11% EPA and 8% DHA in one development and 24% EPA in another.

Eggs
Eggs produced by hens fed a diet of greens and insects contain higher levels of omega−3 fatty acids than those produced by chickens fed corn or soybeans. In addition to feeding chickens insects and greens, fish oils may be added to their diets to increase the omega−3 fatty acid concentrations in eggs.

The addition of flax and canola seeds, both good sources of alpha-linolenic acid, to the diets of laying chickens, increases the omega−3 content of the eggs, predominantly DHA. However, this enrichment could lead to an increment of lipid oxidation in the eggs if the seeds are used in higher doses, without using an appropriate antioxidant.

The addition of green algae or seaweed to the diets boosts the content of DHA and EPA, which are the forms of omega−3 approved by the FDA for medical claims. A common consumer complaint is "Omega−3 eggs can sometimes have a fishy taste if the hens are fed marine oils".

Meat
Omega−3 fatty acids are formed in the chloroplasts of green leaves and algae. While seaweeds and algae are the sources of omega−3 fatty acids present in fish, grass is the source of omega−3 fatty acids present in grass-fed animals. When cattle are taken off omega−3 fatty acid-rich grass and shipped to a feedlot to be fattened on omega−3 fatty acid deficient grain, they begin losing their store of this beneficial fat. Each day that an animal spends in the feedlot, the amount of omega−3 fatty acids in its meat is diminished.

The omega−6:omega−3 ratio of grass-fed beef is about 2:1, making it a more useful source of omega−3 than grain-fed beef, which usually has a ratio of 4:1.

In a 2009 joint study by the USDA and researchers at Clemson University in South Carolina, grass-fed beef was compared with grain-finished beef. The researchers found that grass-finished beef is higher in moisture content, 42.5% lower total lipid content, 54% lower in total fatty acids, 54% higher in beta-carotene, 288% higher in vitamin E (alpha-tocopherol), higher in the B-vitamins thiamin and riboflavin, higher in the minerals calcium, magnesium, and potassium, 193% higher in total omega−3s, 117% higher in CLA (cis-9, trans-11 octadecenoic acid, a conjugated linoleic acid, which is a potential cancer fighter), 90% higher in vaccenic acid (which can be transformed into CLA), lower in the saturated fats, and has a healthier ratio of omega−6 to omega−3 fatty acids (1.65 vs 4.84). Protein and cholesterol content were equal.

The omega−3 content of chicken meat may be enhanced by increasing the animals' dietary intake of grains high in omega−3, such as flax, chia, and canola.

Kangaroo meat is also a source of omega−3, with fillet and steak containing 74 mg per 100 g of raw meat.

Seal oil
Seal oil is a source of EPA, DPA, and DHA, and is commonly used in Arctic regions. According to Health Canada, it helps to support the development of the brain, eyes, and nerves in children up to 12 years of age. Like all seal products, it is not allowed to be imported into the European Union.

Other sources

A trend in the early 21st century was to fortify food with omega−3 fatty acids. The microalgae Crypthecodinium cohnii and Schizochytrium are rich sources of DHA, but not EPA, and can be produced commercially in bioreactors for use as food additives. Oil from brown algae (kelp) is a source of EPA. The alga Nannochloropsis also has high levels of EPA.

Health effects of omega-3 supplementation

The association between supplementation and a lower risk of all-cause mortality is inconclusive.

Cancer

There is insufficient evidence that supplementation with omega−3 fatty acids has an effect on different cancers. Omega-3 supplements do not improve body weight, muscle maintenance or quality of life in cancer patients.

Cardiovascular disease
Moderate and high quality evidence from a 2020 review showed that EPA and DHA, such as that found in omega−3 polyunsaturated fatty acid supplements, does not appear to improve mortality or cardiovascular health. There is weak evidence indicating that α-linolenic acid may be associated with a small reduction in the risk of a cardiovascular event or the risk of arrhythmia.

A 2018 meta-analysis found no support that daily intake of one gram of omega−3 fatty acid in individuals with a history of coronary heart disease prevents fatal coronary heart disease, nonfatal myocardial infarction or any other vascular event. However, omega−3 fatty acid supplementation greater than one gram daily for at least a year may be protective against cardiac death, sudden death, and myocardial infarction in people who have a history of cardiovascular disease. No protective effect against the development of stroke or all-cause mortality was seen in this population. 

Fish oil supplementation has not been shown to benefit revascularization or abnormal heart rhythms and has no effect on heart failure hospital admission rates. Furthermore, fish oil supplement studies have failed to support claims of preventing heart attacks or strokes. In the EU, a review by the European Medicines Agency of omega−3 fatty acid medicines containing a combination of an ethyl ester of eicosapentaenoic acid and docosahexaenoic acid at a dose of 1 g per day concluded that these medicines are not effective in secondary prevention of heart problems in patients who have had a myocardial infarction.

Evidence suggests that omega−3 fatty acids modestly lower blood pressure (systolic and diastolic) in people with hypertension and in people with normal blood pressure. Omega−3 fatty acids can also reduce heart rate, an emerging risk factor. Some evidence suggests that people with certain circulatory problems, such as varicose veins, may benefit from the consumption of EPA and DHA, which may stimulate blood circulation and increase the breakdown of fibrin, a protein involved in blood clotting and scar formation.
Omega−3 fatty acids reduce blood triglyceride levels, but do not significantly change the level of LDL cholesterol or HDL cholesterol. The American Heart Association position (2011) is that borderline elevated triglycerides, defined as 150–199 mg/dL, can be lowered by 0.5–1.0 grams of EPA and DHA per day; high triglycerides 200–499 mg/dL benefit from 1–2 g/day; and >500 mg/dL be treated under a physician's supervision with 2–4 g/day using a prescription product. In this population omega−3 fatty acid supplementation decreases the risk of heart disease by about 25%.

A 2019 review found that omega-3 fatty acid supplements make little or no difference to cardiovascular mortality and that patients with myocardial infarction yield no benefit in taking the supplements. A 2021 review found that omega-3 supplementation did not affect cardiovascular disease outcomes. A 2021 meta-analysis showed that use of marine omega-3 supplementation was associated with an increased risk of atrial fibrillation, with the risk appearing to increase for doses greater than one gram per day.

Chronic kidney disease

In people with chronic kidney disease (CKD) who require hemodialysis, there is a risk that vascular blockage due to clotting, may prevent dialysis therapy from being possible. Omega-3 fatty acids contribute to the production of eicosanoid molecules that reduce clotting. However, a Cochrane review in 2018 did not find clear evidence that omega-3 supplementation has any impact on the prevention of vascular blockage in people with CKD.  There was also moderate certainty that supplementation did not prevent hospitalisation or death within a 12-month period.

Stroke

A 2022 Cochrane review of controlled trials did not find clear evidence that marine-derived omega-3 supplementation improves cognitive and physical recovery or social, and emotional wellbeing following stroke diagnosis, nor prevents stroke recurrence and mortality. In this review, mood appeared to worsen slightly among those receiving 3g fish oil supplementation for 12 weeks; psychometric scores changed by 1.41 (0.07 to 2.75) points less than those receiving palm and soy oil.  However this represented only a single small study and was not observed in a study lasting more than 3 months. Overall, the review was limited by the low number of high-quality evidence available.

Inflammation
A 2013 systematic review found tentative evidence of benefit for lowering inflammation levels in healthy adults and in people with one or more biomarkers of metabolic syndrome. Consumption of omega−3 fatty acids from marine sources lowers blood markers of inflammation such as C-reactive protein, interleukin 6, and TNF alpha.

For rheumatoid arthritis, one systematic review found consistent but modest evidence for the effect of marine n−3 PUFAs on symptoms such as "joint swelling and pain, duration of morning stiffness, global assessments of pain and disease activity" as well as the use of non-steroidal anti-inflammatory drugs. The American College of Rheumatology has stated that there may be modest benefit from the use of fish oils, but that it may take months for effects to be seen, and cautions for possible gastrointestinal side effects and the possibility of the supplements containing mercury or vitamin A at toxic levels. The National Center for Complementary and Integrative Health has concluded that "supplements containing omega−3 fatty acids... may help relieve rheumatoid arthritis symptoms" but warns that such supplements "may interact with drugs that affect blood clotting".

Developmental disabilities

One meta-analysis concluded that omega−3 fatty acid supplementation demonstrated a modest effect for improving ADHD symptoms. A Cochrane review of PUFA (not necessarily omega−3) supplementation found "there is little evidence that PUFA supplementation provides any benefit for the symptoms of ADHD in children and adolescents", while a different review found "insufficient evidence to draw any conclusion about the use of PUFAs for children with specific learning disorders". Another review concluded that the evidence is inconclusive for the use of omega−3 fatty acids in behavior and non-neurodegenerative neuropsychiatric disorders such as ADHD and depression.

A 2015 meta-analysis of the effect of omega−3 supplementation during pregnancy did not demonstrate a decrease in the rate of preterm birth or improve outcomes in women with singleton pregnancies with no prior preterm births. A 2018 Cochrane systematic review with moderate to high quality of evidence suggested that omega−3 fatty acids may reduce risk of perinatal death, risk of low body weight babies; and possibly mildly increased LGA babies.

A 2021 umbrella review with moderate to high quality of evidence suggested that "omega-3 supplementation during pregnancy can exert favorable effects against pre-eclampsia, low-birth weight, pre-term delivery, and post-partum depression, and can improve anthropometric measures, immune system, and visual activity in infants and cardiometabolic risk factors in pregnant mothers."

Mental health

Omega-3 supplementation has not been shown to significantly affect symptoms of anxiety, major depressive disorder or schizophrenia. A 2021 Cochrane review concluded that there is not "sufficient high‐certainty evidence to determine the effects of n‐3PUFAs as a treatment for MDD". Omega−3 fatty acids have also been investigated as an add-on for the treatment of depression associated with bipolar disorder although there is limited data available. Two reviews have suggested that omega-3 fatty acid supplementation significantly improves depressive symptoms in perinatal women.

In contrast to dietary supplementation studies, there is significant difficulty in interpreting the literature regarding dietary intake of omega−3 fatty acids (e.g. from fish) due to participant recall and systematic differences in diets. There is also controversy as to the efficacy of omega−3, with many meta-analysis papers finding heterogeneity among results which can be explained mostly by publication bias. A significant correlation between shorter treatment trials was associated with increased omega−3 efficacy for treating depressed symptoms further implicating bias in publication.

Cognitive aging

A 2016 Cochrane review found no convincing evidence for the use of omega‐3 PUFA supplements in treatment of Alzheimer's disease or dementia. There is preliminary evidence of effect on mild cognitive problems, but none supporting an effect in healthy people or those with dementia. A 2020 review suggested that omega 3 supplementation has no effect on global cognitive function but has a mild benefit in improving memory in non-demented adults.

A 2022 review found promising evidence for prevention of cognitive decline in people who regularly eat long-chain omega 3 rich foods. Conversely, clinical trials with participants already diagnosed with Alzheimer's show no effect.

Brain and visual functions
Brain function and vision rely on dietary intake of DHA to support a broad range of cell membrane properties, particularly in grey matter, which is rich in membranes. A major structural component of the mammalian brain, DHA is the most abundant omega−3 fatty acid in the brain. Omega 3 PUFA supplementation has no effect on macular degeneration or development of visual loss.

Atopic diseases
Results of studies investigating the role of LCPUFA supplementation and LCPUFA status in the prevention and therapy of atopic diseases (allergic rhinoconjunctivitis, atopic dermatitis, and allergic asthma) are controversial; therefore,  it could not be stated either that the nutritional intake of n−3 fatty acids has a clear preventive or therapeutic role, or that the intake of n-6 fatty acids has a promoting role in the context of atopic diseases.

Phenylketonuria and omega-3 intake 
People with PKU often have low intake of omega−3 fatty acids, because nutrients rich in omega−3 fatty acids are excluded from their diet due to high protein content.

Asthma
As of 2015, there was no evidence that taking omega−3 supplements can prevent asthma attacks in children.

Diabetes

A 2019 review found that omega-3 supplements have no effect on prevention and treatment of type 2 diabetes.

See also

 Essential fatty acid interactions
 Essential nutrients
 Inflammation
 Olive oil regulation and adulteration
 Omega-6 fatty acid
 Omega-7 fatty acid
 Omega-9 fatty acid
 Ratio of fatty acids in different foods
 Reinforced lipids

References

Further reading

External links 

Alkenoic acids
Anti-inflammatory agents
Biologically-based therapies
Fatty acids